The Durango and Silverton Narrow Gauge Railroad, often abbreviated as the D&SNG, is a 3 ft (914 mm) narrow-gauge heritage railroad that operates on  of track between Durango and Silverton, in the U.S. state of Colorado. The railway is a federally-designated National Historic Landmark and was also designated by the American Society of Civil Engineers as a National Historic Civil Engineering Landmark in 1968.

The route was originally opened in 1882 by the Denver and Rio Grande Western Railroad (D&RGW) to transport silver and gold ore mined from the San Juan Mountains. The line was an extension of the D&RG  narrow-gauge line from Antonito, Colorado to Durango. The last train to operate into Durango from the east was on December 6, 1968. The states of New Mexico and Colorado purchased 64 miles of track between Antonito and Chama, New Mexico in 1970, which is operated  today as the Cumbres and Toltec Scenic Railroad (C&TSRR). Trackage between Chama and Durango was removed by 1971.

The line from Durango to Silverton has run continuously since 1881, although it is now a tourist and heritage line hauling passengers, and is one of the few places in the U.S. which has seen continuous use of steam locomotives. In March 1981, the Denver and Rio Grande Western Railroad (D&RGW) sold the line and the D&SNG was formed. Today, the D&SNG, along with the C&TSRR, are the only two remaining parts of the former D&RGW narrow-gauge network. The railroad has a total of nine narrow-gauge steam locomotives (eight of which are operational) and ten narrow-gauge diesel locomotives, six of which were acquired within the last five years, on its current roster.

Some rolling-stock dates back to the 1880s. Trains operate from Durango to the Cascade Wye in the winter months and Durango–Silverton during the summer months. Durango depot was built in January, 1882 and has been preserved in its original form.

History

William Jackson Palmer (1836–1908) was a former Union General (serving in the American Civil War) who came to Colorado after managing the construction of the Kansas Pacific Railway into Denver in 1870. Prior to the war, he had risen within the ranks of the Pennsylvania Railroad, serving as secretary to the president. After arriving in Denver, he formulated a plan to build a  narrow-gauge railroad southward from Denver to El Paso, Texas (see Denver and Rio Grande Western Railroad). In 1871, the Denver & Rio Grande Railway began to lay rails south from Denver. Palmer and his associates had agreed that the choice of  narrow-gauge would be well suited to the mountainous country, and relatively less expensive construction costs would enhance the viability of the new railroad. The original north–south plans of the D&RG eventually expanded to include extensions throughout the booming mining country of central and southwestern Colorado.

In July 1881, the Denver & Rio Grande reached Durango and started building the final 45-mile stretch up the Animas River to Silverton. The first 18 miles to Rockwood were completed by late November. The remainder of the route entered the narrow Animas Canyon, which has steep granite walls.  The labor crew, made up of mostly Chinese and Irish immigrants, blasted the canyon cliffs off and left a narrow, level shelf to lay the tracks on.   Grading was completed by late spring 1882.

The D&RG reached Silverton on July 10, 1882. Trains hauling passengers and freight began immediately. The D&RG soon re-emerged as the Denver and Rio Grande Railroad (1886) and ultimately began operating as the Denver and Rio Grande Western Railroad (D&RGW) on July 31, 1921, after re-organization of the Colorado lines and Rio Grande Western of Utah. Eventually, the railroad became widely known as the "Rio Grande".

The Silverton branch, as it became known, struggled under D&RG ownership following the Panic of 1893 and the end of free coinage of silver. Typical of many portions of the surviving narrow-gauge branches into the middle of the twentieth century, the line faced sagging revenue due to ever-declining mining ventures, highway trucking competition and insignificant passenger revenue. Annual snowslides and several major floods on the branch would only continue to challenge the railroad's ability to survive.

The Silverton 
After World War II, domestic tourism began to grow across the country and the Silverton branch of the railroad would benefit. Bolstered by national exposure via Hollywood movies being filmed along the line in the late 1940s, the railroad created The Silverton, a summer-only train service, on June 24, 1947. A short time later, the railroad adorned a locomotive and four coaches with a colorful yellow paint scheme and launched modest public promotion. With this effort, "The Painted Train" officially started a new era of tourism that continues to this day. Freight traffic, however, continued to decline, and during the 1950s The Silverton operated as a mixed train.

By the 1960s, a modernized D&RGW did not see the Silverton Branch as worthy to maintain and a petition was filed with governmental agencies to abandon it. The Interstate Commerce Commission declined to grant the request due to the continued increase in tourist patronage. Following the ICC's ruling, the railroad reluctantly responded by investing in additional rolling stock, track maintenance and improvements to the Durango depot. The railroad purchased some of the property around the depot, cleaned-up the block extending north to Sixth Street and facilitated the opening of gift shops and other tourist-friendly businesses. As ridership continued to grow, the D&RGW operated a second train to Silverton on certain days.

The 1970s 
Since 1971, the Silverton branch and nearby Cumbres and Toltec Scenic Railroad (C&TSRR) were the only remnants of the Rio Grande's once extensive narrow-gauge system. During the late 1970s, the D&RGW was actively trying to sell the Silverton branch and, in 1979, Charles Bradshaw, a Florida citrus grower, offered the railroad a legitimate opportunity to divest itself of the now-isolated route. On October 5, 1980, The Silverton made its last run under D&RGW ownership and,  after operating a work train the following day, the railroad finally concluded its  narrow-gauge train operations, bringing to a close an era that began 110 years earlier with its narrow-gauge railroad from Denver to Colorado Springs.

2000s 
In June, 2018, the railroad shut down for several weeks due to a wildfire, named the "416 Fire", which was fought by two air tankers, six helicopters and some 400 firefighters on the ground. An estimated  of the San Juan National Forest were burned, with losses estimated at more than $31 million. Given the fire risk from coal cinder-sparked wildfires, the railroad's owner plans to invest several million dollars to replace coal-power with oil-power for its steam locomotives and has acquired two new narrow-gauge diesel  locomotives. The railroad's coal-burning steam locomotives were suspected of sparking the "416 Fire" blaze, and some area businesses and residents filed a civil lawsuit against the railroad and its owner in mid-September, 2018. The railroad aims to have at least half of its operational steam locomotives converted to oil-power.

In March, 2020, the Coronavirus (COVID-19) outbreak in the country severely affected the US. For the safety and protection of guests and employees, the D&SNG suspended all operations until at least June 23, 2020.

New ownership
The D&SNG was founded by Charles Bradshaw Jr., of Florida, with the intent of purchasing the right-of-way and equipment while expanding the infrastructure and passenger revenue. His plans were fulfilled with the March 25, 1981, acquisition of the D&RGW's  Silverton branch and all of its structures and rolling stock.

The improvements to the railroad in the 1980s would prove to be the most dramatic growth on the Silverton Branch since the earlier part of the century. Bolstered by the assistance of former Rio Grande operating managers and a relatively sizeable staff of new employees, Bradshaw's plans were set in motion immediately. Included in the sale were former D&RGW locomotives and rolling stock that had not seen service in Durango for many years. "K-36" and "K-37" class locomotives were eventually restored to operating condition, and these larger classes of engines operated to Silverton for the first time ever following bridge and right-of-way improvements to the line. 1880s vintage coaches were exquisitely restored and new coaches were added to the roster of rolling stock. For the first time in many years, double-headed trains (trains with two locomotives) and additional scheduled trains were employed to handle the continually-growing passenger trade. The Durango yard facilities also saw dramatic improvements. An extension was added to the old roundhouse, a new car shop was built on the site of the original "car barn", and the depot saw extensive repair and internal modifications. The workforce grew with the railroad, and Durango's tourist image expanded as new businesses and revamping of the old railroad town continued to take shape. The original 1881 Durango roundhouse was completely destroyed by fire in the winter of 1989. All six operable locomotives had been inside at the time and were damaged, but not beyond repair. All locomotives were eventually restored to operating condition. A new roundhouse was constructed on the same site, opening in early 1990, and its facade made use of bricks salvaged from the original building.

In March 1997, Bradshaw sold the D&SNG to First American Railways, Inc., located in Hollywood, Florida. Then, in July 1998, the railroad was sold again, to American Heritage Railways. At the time, American Heritage Railways was headquartered in Coral Gables, Florida. Since then, its headquarters were moved to Durango, Colorado. The D&SNG has two museums, one each in Durango and Silverton.

Management
Allen C. Harper — owner and CEO
Carol Harper — owner and president
Jeff Johnson — general manager
John Harper — senior vice president
Cathy Swartz — CFO

D&SNG engines

As of 2023, the Durango and Silverton Narrow Gauge Railroad appears to operate nineteen locomotives, eight coal-fired and/or converted oil-fired steam engines and nine diesel engines. The current roster goes as follows:

Steam

Technical information
The steam-powered locomotives used today on the Durango and Silverton Narrow Gauge Railroad were built during the 1920s. There are three classes, K-28, K-36 and K-37, which are all based on wheel arrangement and pulling power of the locomotive. As of 2023, of the nine steam locomotives currently owned by the D&SNG, Nos. 473, 476, 480, 481, 482 and 493 are all operational.

The K represents the nickname "Mikado" that describes a locomotive with two non-powered, pivoting wheels in front of eight driving wheels, which are connected to driving rods powered by the engine's pistons and finally two non-powered trailer wheels located under the cab. The name comes from the fact that the first significant use of the type was a series built by Baldwin Locomotive Works for the Japanese Railways in 1887.

The numbers 28 and 36 designate the tractive effort (pulling force) of the locomotives in thousands of pounds.

470 series

The 470 series, or "K-28" class  "Mikado" type locomotives, were ten engines designed for freight service along the D&RG. They were built by the Schenectady Locomotive Works of the American Locomotive Company (ALCO) in Schenectady, New York in 1923. The K-28s have . of tractive effort, superheated, and the boilers are fed by two non-lifting injectors.

Air brakes are 6-ET automatic and also feature a straight air secondary braking system for daily passenger trains. Due to their smaller size, these engines are often used on the D&SNG for shorter trains, usually the first or last on the schedule, and often for helper service or sectioned trains. Despite being smaller than the K-36 class locomotives, older and less powerful, the engine crews tend to favor a trip on these engines because the design ALCO used was superior in balance and servicing. Firing can be tricky when the engine is working hard, as the clam shell-style firedoors tend to pull into the backhead of the boiler due to the draft, and if any flues in the boiler are leaking, the loss of draft on the fire is much harder to work around than on the K-36 locomotives. Firing while the engine is working hard is done with a large "heel" pattern, generally with as little coal on the flue sheet as possible, and gradually sloping the fire bed towards the door sheet to the height or higher than the firedoors. This results in the draft being forced through the fire bed in the thinner areas towards the flue sheet, which usually is hindered by the lack of draft between the grates and the arch brick. New firemen sometimes have a hard time learning this, because the art of "reading" a fire takes time to learn and the amount of time working on the K-28 class locomotives is much-reduced compared to the railroad's usual K-36 workhorses, which have a larger firebox and are more forgiving in technique.

Out of the original ten only three 470s remain, and all are owned and operated by the D&SNG. The other seven were requisitioned by the United States Army in 1942 to be used on the White Pass & Yukon Route in Alaska during World War II. They were later dismantled for scrap in 1946.

Locomotives 473, 476 and 478 operated on many parts of the D&RGW. Engine 473 served frequently on the Chili Line that operated between Antonito, Colorado and Santa Fe, New Mexico, until the line was abandoned in 1941. 476 and 478 saw an extensive service on the San Juan passenger train, which ran between Durango, Colorado and Alamosa, Colorado until 1951. 473, 476 and 478 operated on the Silverton Branch from the 1950s through 1980 and are still in service today.

In July 2015, the D&SNG and C&TSRR had announced an engine-trade propasal by which the 478 would go to Chama, New Mexico, and, in exchange, the D&SNG would get K-36 class No. 483, which had not seen operation in several years. Since the swap failed to go through, the D&SNG announced in June 2016 that it was going to restore 476 to operating condition and place 478 in the museum.

 No. 473 has been converted to an oil burner and is operational.
 No. 476 has been converted to an oil burner and is operational.
 No. 478 is placed on display in the D&SNG Museum awaiting an overhaul in the distant future.

480 series

The 480 series, or "K-36" class  "Mikado" type locomotives, were ten engines designed for the D&RGW. They were built by the Baldwin Locomotive Works in 1925. The 480s were the last ten narrow-gauge locomotives constructed for the D&RGW. The 480s were used for freight-hauling throughout the D&RGW  narrow-gauge network. These engines are outside- frame Mikados, and all drive wheels have counterbalancing outside of the frame, resulting in the utilitarian look the engines are known for.

The engines currently use 6-ET automatic air and the secondary straight air used on regular service equipment. The railroad runs 12-car passenger trains behind these engines; however more cars require the train to be double-headed. Despite popular belief that the railroad does not doublehead trains out of Durango because of smoke, the real reason is the weight restriction on the bridge at 15th Street, not allowing more than one K-36 at a time (K-28 class engines, however, are still doubleheaded from Durango). The engines were delivered with Master Mechanics-design smokeboxes for draft; however at some point the D&RGW converted them to Andersson (cyclone) front ends. Water is fed to the boiler by two non-lifting injectors. The  grate surface in the firebox is among the largest built for a narrow-gauge locomotive and is fed by hand-firing. Firing is simpler on these engines compared to the K-28s; however, the larger surface area requires more fuel. Ergonomically, the engines are less comfortable than the others as well, with the crew seats being farther back from the backhead and the engineer having to lean forward constantly to adjust the throttle and use the sanders. The running gear on the locomotives also tend to wear out faster than the ALCO-designed K-28s, and the resulting pounding and rough ride can take a toll on the engine crew.

The D&SNG owns four K-36s: Nos. 480, 481, 482 and 486, all of which are operational. The Cumbres and Toltec Scenic Railroad (C&TSRR) owns Nos. 483, 484, 487, 488 and 489. Locomotive No. 485, unfortunately, fell into the turntable pit in Salida, Colorado in 1955. It was scrapped for parts thereafter; however, some accessories, running and valve gear were salvaged and used on other locomotives.

 No. 480 has been converted to an oil burner and is operational.
 No. 481 is operational and is the only remaining active coal burner left on the D&SNG’s roster.
 No. 482 has been converted to an oil burner and is operational.
 No. 486 is undergoing an overhaul and conversion to an oil burner.

490 series

The 490 series, or "K-37" class  "Mikado" type locomotives, were part of a class of thirty standard-gauge class 190 (later, class C-41) 2-8-0 "Consolidation-" type engines built in 1902 for the D&RG by Baldwin Locomotive Works. In 1928 and 1930, ten of the C-41s boilers were used to build the Rio Grande's K-37 class of steam locomotive. 

At first the D&SNG operated only one K-37: #497, which was rebuilt in 1984 and operated for seven years, being the first K-37 to go to Silverton, and under its own power.

It was later determined that the trailing truck was having trouble negotiating the curves in the Animas Canyon. For this reason, the D&SNG traded #497 to the C&TSRR in exchange for K-36 class #482. This trade was mutually beneficial for both railroads as it gave the C&TSRR a fully operational locomotive, giving in exchange a locomotive that had never run and likely would never operate under C&TSRR ownership.

Numbers 493 and 498 are owned by the D&SNG, but #498 is not operational and serving as a parts source. Number 499 was also owned by the D&SNG at one time, lacking a tender and was on display in the museum. #499 was later traded for K-36 class No. 486 at Royal Gorge Park, including the tender from #498.

No. 493 was shifted around a few times on the railroad on display a few times, last ending up in the Silverton yard until May 4, 2016, when #493 was hauled to Durango from Silverton by K-36 #481. #493 to be transported to the Colorado Railroad Museum in Golden, Colorado on a 10-year lease, where it would be restored to operational condition and run it for those 10 years; then returned to the D&SNG. However, plans were cancelled and #493 sat outside the Durango roundhouse with an uncertain future for some time until early 2018, when she was put in the roundhouse for restoration. In response to the 416 fire, the D&SNG announced their plans to restore #493 publicly and that the locomotive was their first candidate for an oil conversion, with more to come in the future. #493 ran under its own power for the first time on January 24, 2020, and has been the D&SNG's primary piece of motive power throughout 2020 and 2021.

 No. 493 has been converted to an oil burner and is operational.
 No. 497 was traded to the C&TSRR in October, 1991 and is awaiting an overhaul in the Chama roundhouse.
 No. 498 is stored partially disassembled in Durango.
 No. 499 was traded to the Royal Gorge Park in May, 1999 and is placed on display.

Diesel engines
Diesels were first introduced to the Durango Yard in the 1960s with diesel locomotive #50. Today, #50 is now on display at the Colorado Railroad Museum in Golden, Colorado. The United States Transportation Corps. also had a six-axle narrow-gauge diesel locomotive (#3000) for trial use in Durango in the 1950s, which saw limited use.

 Diesel engine #1, nicknamed the "Hotshot", is a 50-ton center-cab diesel built by General Electric in 1957. It was acquired from the Arkansas Limestone Railroad. During the 2002 Missionary Ridge Fire, the D&SNG voluntarily shut-down steam service. To help continue service, Hotshot pulled coaches out along the highline from Rockwood, Colorado. It is currently stationed in Durango.
 Diesel engine #2, nicknamed the “P.B. II”, is a 45-ton center-cab diesel built by General Electric in February, 1951 and was originally Algoma Steel #1, from Sault Ste. Marie, Ontario. It was later sold to the Yosemite Mountain Sugar Pine Railroad in May, 2006. It is currently in service on the YMSPRR as their #402.
 Diesel engine #4 is a 55-ton center-cab diesel built by General Electric in August, 1955 and was originally Algoma Steel #4, from Sault Ste. Marie, Ontario. It was later sold to the Colorado Railroad Museum in 2004. It is currently in service at the C.R.R.M. as Golden City & San Juan #4.
 Diesel engine #5 is a 45-ton center-cab diesel built by General Electric in May, 1960 and was originally Algoma Steel #5, Sault Ste. Marie, Ontario. It currently remains stored partially disassembled in Durango.
 Diesel engine #7, nicknamed the "Big Al", is an 87-ton center-cab diesel built by General Electric in August, 1975 and was originally Algoma Steel #7, from Sault Ste. Marie, Ontario. Big Al is named after the current owner of the D&SNG, Allen C. Harper. It was later sold to the Colorado Railroad Museum in December, 2021 and eventually moved there on April 20, 2022. It is currently in service at the C.R.R.M.
 Diesel engine #9 was first acquired by the D&SNG in March, 2006 and is a 92-ton center-cab diesel built by General Electric (exact date unknown). #9 was later traded to the Georgetown Loop Railroad in March, 2017 in exchange for its Porter type DE75CT diesel engine #1203. It is currently in service on the GLRY.
 Diesel engine #11, nicknamed the “P.B.”, was built by U.S. Steel with GE parts (exact date unknown). It was acquired in March, 2006 and is a 98-ton center-cab diesel.
 Diesel engine #101 is one of four former White Pass & Yukon Route type DL-535E diesels recently acquired in April, 2020. It was built by the Montreal Locomotive Works in May, 1969. It arrived at the D&SNG in late September, 2020.
 Diesel engine #103 is one of four former White Pass & Yukon Route type DL-535E diesels recently acquired in April, 2020. It was built by the Montreal Locomotive Works in May, 1969. It arrived at the D&SNG in late September, 2021.
 Diesel engine #106 is one of four former White Pass & Yukon Route type DL-535E diesels recently acquired in April, 2020. It was built by the Montreal Locomotive Works in May, 1969. It arrived at the D&SNG in late September, 2021.
 Diesel engine #107 is one of four former White Pass & Yukon Route type DL-535E diesels recently acquired in April, 2020. It was built by the Montreal Locomotive Works in May, 1969. It arrived at the D&SNG in late August, 2020.
 Diesel engine #1201 is one of two custom-built type MP2000NG diesels acquired from Motive Power and Equipment Solutions in 2018, in response to the 416 Fire near Durango. It was built between 2018 and 2020, rebuilt from an ex-Tri-Rail F40PHL-2 and was originally announced to have the number 550, which is the number that was chosen in reference to the highway linking Durango and Silverton. It arrived at the D&SNG in early November, 2020. It is currently stored in Durango awaiting to be put into service.
 Diesel engine #1202 is one of two custom-built type MP2000NG diesels acquired from Motive Power and Equipment Solutions in 2018 in response to the 416 Fire near Durango. It was built between 2018 and 2020, rebuilt from an ex-Tri-Rail F40PHL-2, and was originally announced to have the number 416, which is the number that was chosen in recognition of the extraordinary effort that was undertaken by firefighters to fight the fire. It arrived at the D&SNG in late October, 2020. It is currently stored in Durango awaiting to be put into service.
 Diesel engine #1203 is a type DE75CT diesel built by H.K. Porter in January, 1946, originally for U.S. Gypsum. It was acquired in March, 2017 from the Georgetown Loop Railroad in trade for GE 92-ton center-cab diesel engine #9.
RB-1 (railbus) was built in the winter of 1987–1988. It was originally numbered 1001 and was named Tamarron. It could seat 32 people, had its own baggage compartment, had its own restroom and had a  six-cylinder Caterpillar diesel engine. This unit was intended for use on the Animas River Railway; when that operation was shut-down, it was found being used as a switcher in the Durango yard. Years later, it was put into revenue service during the 2002 Missionary Ridge Fire.
 In April, 2020, it was announced that four MLW type DL-535E diesels have been purchased from the White Pass & Yukon Route in Skagway, Alaska. The first two of those diesels (Nos. 101 and 107) were delivered between late August and late September, 2020. The other two diesels (Nos. 103 and 106) were delivered in late September, 2021.

D&SNG rolling stock

The Durango and Silverton Narrow Gauge Railroad currently operates over 50 pieces of rolling stock. Some of the cars are the oldest passenger cars in existence.

Concession cars

Like most of the coaches on the D&SNG, the concession cars are good examples of how coaches were renumbered and rebuilt several times by the D&RGW.
Concession car 64 was originally D&RG mail-baggage 64 built in 1889. In 1983 it was purchased from the Black Hills Central Railroad. 64 returned to service in 1984 as a concession car.
Concession car 126 was originally D&RG baggage car 27. It was renumbered 126 in 1886. It was converted to a coach-snack bar by the D&RGW in 1963 then reconverted in 1979 to a coach. It was reconverted to a full concession car by the D&SNG in 1982.
Concession car 212 was originally D&RG coach 20 built in 1879. In 1887 it was rebuilt into a combination coach-baggage car and numbered 215. In 1942, 215 had been sold to a Mexican railway. Then the D&RGW realized that it was larger than another combination car 212. The numbers of the car were switched and the smaller car was sent to Mexico. In 1964 converted to a coach-snack bar by the D&RGW, then to a 48-passenger coach in 1979. In 1982 it was converted to a snack bar car by the D&SNG. Then, in 1986, it was converted to a full concession car.
Concession car 566 was originally D&RG mail car 14 built in 1882. Around 1888 it was rebuilt into excursion car 566. In July 1904 it was renumbered 0566. Then it was switched to work service in 1914. It was rebuilt to its original appearance as a postal car by the D&SNG. It was then given its old excursion car number of 566 and is now used as a concession car.

Coaches

The D&SNG operates one combination car 213 named Bitter Root Mine, it was previously named Home Ranch and was built in 1983 by the D&SNG. It has a hydraulic lift for passengers in wheelchairs.

The D&SNG operates several other coaches:

256, built in 1880, former RGS, purchased in 2022 and currently stored awaiting restoration.
257 Shenandoah, built in 1880, originally numbered 267 until sold to the Rio Grande Southern Railroad, later reacquired by the D&SNG.
270 Pinkerton, built in 1880
291 King Mine, built in 1881
311 McPhee, built in 1881
319 Needleton, built in 1882
323 Animas City, built in 1887
327 Durango, built in 1887
330 Cascade, built in 1963
331 Trimble, built in 1963
332 La Plata, built in 1964
333 Tacoma, built in 1964
334 Hermosa, built in 1964
335 Elk Park, built in 1964
336 Rockwood, built in 1964
337 Fort Lewis, built in 1964
503 Crazy Woman Creek, acquired in 2019. 503 was originally a flat car built in the 1940s, then converted for use as a coach in 1982 by the Cumbres and Toltec Scenic Railroad.

Cinco Animas B-2

Built in 1883, the Cinco Animas was originally an immigrant sleeper. Immigrant sleepers had very few amenities and had little consideration for passenger comfort. The original Cinco Animas could seat up to thirty passengers. It was turned into a business car in 1913. In 1963 it was purchased by the Cinco Animas Corporation, where it received its present name. Then, in 1982, the Cinco Animas was sold to the D&SNG. It runs daily throughout the summer.

Nomad B-3
Built in 1878, the Nomad was originally named Fairplay. In 1886, it was rebuilt as Business Car N. It is reportedly the favorite car of D&RG president William Jackson Palmer. The Fairplay has hosted Presidents William H Taft, Ulysses S Grant and Theodore Roosevelt. While being owned by several parties between 1951 and 1982 the Fairplay was renamed the Nomad. It was acquired by the D&SNG in 1982. Today it is the oldest private railroad coach still in service in the United States. It runs daily throughout the summer.

General Palmer B-7
The General Palmer was built in 1880 as a business car for the D&RG. In later years it fell into disrepair. It was restored in 2001 at a cost of $250,000 by the D&SNG. Its modern amenities include internet service and a twenty-inch flat paneled television. The General Palmer is exclusively used by owner Allen Harper, his family and guests.

San Juan 312
Built by the D&RG in 1887, it had clerestory roof and bullnose ends. It was finished in ash and seated forty-six. It was rebuilt in 1937 at the Alamosa shops. Vestuable ends, train-line steam heat, electric lights, and deluxe Heywood-Wakefield reclining coach seats for 24 passenger were installed. The D&SNG named coach 312 the Silverton. In the winter of 2007–2008 it was rebuilt with overstuffed seating for in a wide three across arrangement and had its name changed to San Juan. It runs during the summer time.

Alamosa 350

Built in 1880, it was originally named the Hildago as Horton chair car number 25. It was changed to car 403 in 1885. It was then rebuilt into an office living car for members of the Valuation Survey in 1919. Valuation Survey was inventorying the entire railroad property after it was returned to the D&RGW after World War 1. In 1924 it was converted into a parlor-smoker car. After a rebuild in 1937 it became a parlor-buffet car named Alamosa. The car had a closed vestibule, with steam heat, electric lights and seats for fourteen passengers. In 1957 it was converted for coach service. It was renumbered 350 in 1959. In 1981 it was purchased by the D&SNG and converted to a parlor car and seats twenty-five people. There was another car with the same name that was destroyed in a derailment on the Rio Grande Southern Railroad. It runs daily throughout the summer.

Prospector 630
Was built in 1984 as a coach and was named Hunt. In 2009 it became a family upscale coach. The Prospector features comfortable table and chair style seating. The ceiling of the Prospector features an enlarged route map, making it easy for passengers to follow the train's progress along the route.

Tall Timber Legend 631 & Tall Timber Legacy 632
631 was built in 1985 and named the North Star. 632 was built in 1986 and named Teft. Both cars were built as general passenger cars to help with the increase in passengers. In 2009 the cars were converted with overstuffed seats. They are used mainly to take passengers to Tall Timber to go zip lining.

Open observation gondolas

Open observation gondolas 400–402 were built in 1963, equipped with passenger car trucks, steel roofs, tile floors and tramway seats. Gondolas 403–405 were built for the 1967 season on The Silverton. Between 1982 and 1985 the D&SNG built Open Observation cars 411 and 412. Open Observation cars 406–409 and 413–416 were built between 1982 and 1986
 Cars 400–405 and 411–412 are former standard gauge boxcars, built in 1916
 Cars 406–409 and 413–416 are former standard gauge stock cars, built in 1937

Silver Vista 313
The original Silver Vista was built in 1947 by the D&RGW. It was a popular glass-topped observation car and the only one of its kind. The original Silver Vista was destroyed by a fire in Alamosa in 1953. Because of its popularity, there has been speculation that the D&RGW destroyed it on purpose to drive revenue down so they could abandon the line from Silverton to Antonito. The recreation of the Silver Vista was built in 2006. It runs daily throughout the summer.

Rio Grande No. 410
Built in the winter of 1987–1988, the Rio Grande was originally railbus trailer 1002 and was painted red. It was used with the Animas Canyon Railway Diesel-powered rail-bus. It was stored from 1992 to 1997, until it was rebuilt as an open observation car 313. It was given number 313, because it resembled the Silver Vista. After the Silver Vista was built in 2006, it became open observation car 410. In the winter of 2006–2007 it was again rebuilt into an open air observation car with comfortable and large overstuffed seats for a more expansive view. It runs daily during the summer.

Cabooses

Caboose No. 0505 was built in 1886 and is stocked with provisions to provide shelter and food. Currently out of service.

Caboose No. 0540 was built in 1881 and is a mini-warehouse, carrying the most common tools and supplies. It is used by Maintenance of Way.

Caboose No. 0500
It was originally known as D&RG No. 1. In 1950 it was sold to Bob Richardson, then again in 1987 to a business in Cripple Creek. In 1993 it was acquired by the D&SNG and was restored to its original condition. It is available for charter and can hold up to eight people. On display in the Museum, out of service.

Rail Camp Car No. 3681
Rail camp car No. 3681 is an ex-D&RGW boxcar. It was rebuilt by the D&SNG in 1984 with a kitchen, a bathroom and beds. It is pulled to Cascade Canyon Wye for elegant camping. It can hold a group of up to eight people. Currently out of service.

Coaches Not in Service
Mail baggage car No. 66 was built in 1887. For some years it was the base of operations for the Animas River Railway in Rockwood, Colorado. Car No. 66 served as the office, ticket window, and waiting room for the railway. It was then moved to Hermosa, Colorado as the maintenance of way office.
Mail baggage car No. 119 was built in 1882. Sold to private individual in 2020 for eventual restoration.
Coach No. 460 is the only  narrow-gauge tourist sleeper remaining from a group built in 1886 for the D&RG. In the early 1900s it was assigned to work service and was used on a D&RGW wrecking train as late as 1957. Then it was sold to the Black Hills Central Railroad in South Dakota. Then in 1983, the D&SNG purchased coach No. 460. It has been chosen to be preserved as is and has no plans to enter service.

Museums
The D&SNG operates two museums, the D&SNG Museum and the Silverton Freight Yard Museum. They both feature historic railway equipment used on the D&RGW line.

D&SNG Museum
Opened in 1998, the D&SNG Museum is a tribute to railroading nationally and southwest Colorado. The museum is located in the Durango roundhouse. Half the roundhouse is used for the steam engines and the other half is for the museum. The museum features memorabilia from the D&RGW and other railroads. It also features many artifacts from the Durango and Silverton areas. There is an HO train layout in the museum. It depicts a narrow-gauge railroad similar to the D&RGW. There is also a movie coach that was used in the filming of Butch Cassidy and the Sundance Kid, where the railroad's informational and educational films are featured.

Class 70 Engine No. 42
On display in the Durango and Silverton RR Museum, engine 42 was one of 6 class-70 2-8-0 locomotives built by Baldwin in 1887 for the D&RG. The engine weighs 35 tons and pulls with 17,100 lbs of tractive effort. It was originally numbered 420. In November 1916 the engine was sold to the Rio Grande Southern and was used till the RGS was dismantled in 1952. Engine 42 and a caboose running from Grady, located east of Mancos, Colorado to Durango was the last train movement on the RGS. In 1953 the engine was sold to the Narrow Gauge Motel in Alamosa. In 1958 the 42 was sold to Magic Mountain Amusement Park in Golden, Colorado, where it was converted to burn fuel oil and operated for a short time. In 1968 the Woodmoor Corporation purchased the Magic Mountain property and in 1969 put engine 42 on display in Monument, Colorado  at the entrance to its Woodmoor subdivision. In 1971 engine 42 returned to Golden as a restaurant display at Heritage Square. Finally, in 1983 it was purchased and brought to Durango. It has never been restored to operating condition. It is on display in the museum.

Baggage Car No. 127
Originally built as flat car No. 6630, it was rebuilt in 1968 as a baggage car for the film Butch Cassidy and the Sundance Kid. No. 127 was the third concession car built by the D&SNG. It saw limited service and acted as a backup concession car. No. 127 is now used as a movie theater in the museum.

Silverton Freight Yard Museum
The Silverton Freight Yard Museum was opened in 1999 and is located at the Silverton depot and rail yard. On display are outfit cars, some equipped with kitchen facilities and side-dumped gondolas. In the Silverton depot are local artifacts.

Animas River Railway
Beginning May 7, 1988 a new Diesel-hydraulic motorcar and trailer railbus began making trips out of Rockwood, Colorado up the Animas canyon. The new company Animas River Railway was incorporated by the D&SNG, as an attempt to preserve the integrity of its own claim of "100% coal-fired steam locomotives". The railbus hauled hikers and fishermen into the canyon from Rockwood. Operations for the Animas River Railway were run out of Rockwood. Former mail baggage car 66 was used as the ticket window, office and waiting room for the railway.

Built in 1987–88 winter, motorcar 1001 was named Tamarron. It could seat 32 people and had a  six-cylinder Caterpillar engine. It also had a baggage compartment and restroom. The trailer 1002 could seat 48 in longitudinal seats.

1988 schedule
The first railbus trip left at 7:30 a.m. on May 7 for Elk Park. There were 12:30 p.m. and 6:00 p.m. trips to Cascade Canyon. The season for the Animas River Railway was supposed to last from May 7 through October 30, but lasted until September 4 due to mechanical problems.

1989 schedule
The railbus was repaired and began operations on May 6, 1989. A 12:01 p.m. trip for Cascade Canyon ran until October 29. From May 27 through September 15 Elk Park trips ran at 7:30 a.m. and 3:30 p.m.

1990 schedule
The schedule for the Animas River Railway remained the same. The last excursion of the Animas River Railway was on September 23 from Rockwood to Cascade. Patronage never met expectations and has not operated since.

2002 schedule
During the 2002 Missionary Ridge Fire, the D&SNG voluntarily shut down steam service. To help continue service, motorcar 1001 now RB-1 and trailer 1002 now 313 took people out to Elk Park from Silverton.

Visiting equipment
Just as narrow-gauge equipment and parts are rare, narrow-gauge railroads are rare these days too. When narrow-gauge pieces of equipment come back to life there are very few places in the United States where they can run. Many of these pieces run during the railroad's annual Railfest held every August. Below are some pieces of  narrow-gauge equipment that visit the D&SNG railroad.

D&RGW No. 315

D&RGW No. 315 is a C-18 locomotive, built in 1895 by Baldwin Locomotive Works. It originally was owned by the Florence and Cripple Creek Railroad as No. 3. It was then bought by D&RG and became No. 425 and, after the railroad was reorganized into D&RGW in 1924, it became No. 315. Around 1941, 315 made its way to Durango and became a yard switcher. It worked around Durango until 1949. To save it from being scrapped, it was leased by the City of Durango as a display. When the D&RGW abandoned the line to Durango, 315 was donated to the Chamber of Commerce in 1968. In 1986 it was put on display at Santa Rita Park. Ownership of 315 was changed from the Chamber of Commerce to the City of Durango. It was restored to operating condition from 1998 to 2007 by the Durango Railroad Historical Society with some assistance from the D&SNG. It was first steamed up and moved under its own power after 58 years on August 24, 2007 at the D&SNG roundhouse during a photography event. Since then the DRHS has operated the locomotive occasionally on the D&SNG and on the Cumbres and Toltec Scenic Railroad. Since 2016, No. 315 has been operating on special excursions and charters at the C&TSRR on loan by the DRHS until 2025.

E&P No. 4

Eureka and Palisade No. 4 is a Class 8/18 C 4-4-0 locomotive, built in 1875 by Baldwin Locomotive Works. It originally was owned by the Eureka and Palisade Railroad, and was later sold to the Sierra Nevada Wood and Lumber Company. In 1938, it was sold to Warner Bros. and was used in many films. Eventually, the engine went to the Old Vegas amusement park in Henderson, Nevada, where it became badly damaged by a fire. Finally, it was bought by Dan Markoff and restored to operating condition. Dan privately owns the engine, and on occasion brings it to various railroads to operate, including the D&SNG.

Casey Jones
The Casey Jones railbus was built in 1915 out of a Model T and is a debatable predecessor of the Galloping Goose. It was originally designed to be an ambulance servicing the Sunnyside Mine in Eureka, Colorado, and was often used by mine officials to commute to Silverton on the Silverton Northern Railroad. It has room for 11 passengers. The Casey Jones was restored and is owned by the San Juan Historical Society in Silverton Colorado. It has run on the D&SNG just a handful of times in the past during special events. It is on display at the Silverton Northern Engine House in the Summer, where D&RGW #315 is also stored when it is not visiting another railroad.

Galloping Goose Railbusses
The Galloping Goose Railbusses are products of the Rio Grande Southern Railroad, a fleet of 7 home made railcars used to haul the US mail and some passengers during the Great Depression. Despite the overall demise of the RGS, 6 of the 7 "Geese" have survived today, and a couple of them have visited the D&SNG a few different times, most notably No. 5. Galloping Goose No. 5 was built with a 1928 Pierce-Arrow limousine body and running gear, and was rebuilt in 1946-47 using a World War II surplus GMC gasoline truck engine and a Wayne Corporation school bus body. In 1950, the freight/mail compartment was converted to carry 20 additional passengers for sightseeing trips. After RGS was scrapped in 1953, Galloping Goose No. 5 came to rest in Dolores, Colorado. Galloping Goose No. 5 was completely restored to operating condition in 1998 by the Galloping Goose Historical Society in Dolores, Colorado.

Southern Pacific No. 18

SP No. 18 is a narrow-gauge 4-6-0 "Ten Wheeler" type locomotive built in 1911 by Baldwin Locomotive Works. It was restored by the Eastern California Museum from 2009 to 2017, with some help from members of the D&S Shop crew. No. 18 later arrived to Durango on lease from the Eastern California Museum in November, 2018 and it stayed until October,  2019. During that time, it was used for oil-fired training in preparation for the D&SNG's conversion of their steam locomotives from coal to oil for fuel. On April 8, 2021, it was announced that No. 18 was to return to the D&SNG from April, 2021 to October, 2021, and on April 11th, it departed for Durango, Colorado via truck. In the 2021 summer season the locomotive has been in helper service for the 15-car Silverton Train, doubleheading from Hermosa to Rockwood, and then from Tank Creek all the way to SIlverton. As the D&SNG works to convert more of its locomotives to oil, No. 18 has been a vital resource serving as a helper.

In popular media
The train is the subject of the song The Silverton, by C. W. McCall.

D&RGW
1950, A Ticket to Tomahawk. An early western Technicolor film in which the scenery and machinery were complemented by a brief bit-player appearance by Marilyn Monroe. The film is out of print as of August, 2006.
1952, Denver and Rio Grande starring Sterling Hayden
1954, Siege at Red River starring Van Johnson
 1955, Run for Cover starring James Cagney. Train scenes shot at the "High Line" above the Animas River Gorge.
1956, Around the World in 80 Days. The cast included Andy Devine, Marlene Dietrich, Buster Keaton, Shirley MacLaine, George Raft, Cesar Romero, Frank Sinatra, and Red Skelton
1957, Night Passage starring James Stewart. Especially interesting is the train traversing the "High Line" above the Animas River Gorge.
1965, The Sons of Katie Elder starring John Wayne and Dean Martin. Opening scenes of the film show D&RGW traveling along the Animas River. 
1966, Gunpoint starring Audie Murphy, Denver Pyle, and Joan Staley. Scenes shot on Highline, upper Animas River canyon, and just south of Rockwood near Shalona Lake.
1969, Butch Cassidy and the Sundance Kid starring Paul Newman, Robert Redford, and Katharine Ross. Famous "cliff jump" scene shot near Baker's Bridge on Animas River in upper Hermosa Valley.
1971, Support Your Local Gunfighter starring James Garner, Suzanne Pleshette, and Harry Morgan

D&SNG
 1988, The Tracker a made-for-television film starring Kris Kristofferson and distributed by HBO Films
 1991, the railroad's own track was featured in a Lexus LS400 commercial.
 2006, The Prestige starring Christian Bale. The train shown in the beginning of the film is the D&SNG.

See also

List of Colorado historic railroads
List of heritage railroads in the United States
Colorado Railroad Museum
Cumbres and Toltec Scenic Railroad
White Pass and Yukon Route
Great Smoky Mountains Railroad
Texas State Railroad

References
Notes

Bibliography

 Royem, Robert T. (2002). America's Railroad: The Official Guidebook of the Durango and Silverton Narrow Gauge Railroad. Published by the Durango & Silverton Narrow Gauge Railroad, First Edition 2002.
 Royem, Robert T. (2007). America's Railroad: The Official Guidebook of the Durango and Silverton Narrow Gauge Railroad. Published by the Durango & Silverton Narrow Gauge Railroad, Second Edition 2007.
 Osterwald, Doris B. (2001). Cinders & Smoke: A mile by mile guide for the Durango & Silverton Narrow Gauge Railroad. Denver, Colorado: Golden Bell Press, Eighth Edition, Thirty-fourth printing, Western Guideways, Ltd., 2001. 
 Danneman, Herbert (2000). Colorado Rail Annual No. 24: A ticket to Ride the Narrow Gauge. Golden, Colorado: Published and distributed by the Colorado Railroad Museum. 
 Brown, Michael (2011). The Silverton Branch of the D&RGW and The Mears Short Lines. Published and distributed by lulu press. First edition 2011.

Further reading

External links 

Durango & Silverton Narrow Gauge Railroad
D&RGW-related Steam Locomotive Rosters

3 ft gauge railways in the United States
Durango, Colorado
Heritage railroads in Colorado
Historic Civil Engineering Landmarks
Museums in La Plata County, Colorado
Museums in San Juan County, Colorado
Narrow gauge railroads in Colorado
National Historic Landmarks in Colorado
National Register of Historic Places in La Plata County, Colorado
National Register of Historic Places in San Juan County, Colorado
Railroad museums in Colorado
Railroad roundhouses in Colorado
Railroad-related National Historic Landmarks
Spin-offs of the Denver & Rio Grande Western Railroad
Transportation in La Plata County, Colorado
Transportation buildings and structures in La Plata County, Colorado
Transportation in San Juan County, Colorado
Rail infrastructure on the National Register of Historic Places in Colorado
Railway lines on the National Register of Historic Places